"Who's Making Love" is a song written by Stax Records staffers Homer Banks, Bettye Crutcher, Don Davis and Raymond Jackson and recorded by singer Johnnie Taylor in 1968.

Released on the Stax label in the late summer of 1968, it became Taylor's breakthrough single, reaching number one on the US Billboard R&B chart and number five on the Billboard Hot 100. It became one of the few singles Taylor would become primarily known for in the mainstream. The song featured the Stax house band, Booker T. & the M.G.'s, and  Isaac Hayes (on keyboards). It was Taylor's best-selling single before the release of "Disco Lady" almost a decade later.

According to Bettye Crutcher, the lyrics were inspired by the 1920s novelty song, "Who Takes Care of the Caretaker's Daughter (While the Caretaker's Busy Taking Care)".

Chart history

Cover versions
Tony Joe White covered the song on his 1968 album Black and White.
Young-Holt Unlimited released a cover on the album Soulful Strut in 1968 and as a single in 1969 (#47 Canada), both on Brunswick Records.
The Blues Brothers released a cover version as a single in 1980, which reached number 39 on the US chart.
Christian McBride included the song in his 2013 album Out Here.

References

1968 singles
Johnnie Taylor songs
Tony Joe White songs
Songs written by Homer Banks
1980 singles
The Blues Brothers songs
Songs written by Raymond Jackson (songwriter)
Songs written by Don Davis (record producer)
1968 songs
Stax Records singles
Songs about infidelity
Song recordings produced by Don Davis (record producer)